Douglas Clifton Brown, 1st Viscount Ruffside,  (16 August 1879 – 5 May 1958) was a British politician who represented the Conservative Party (UK). He served as Speaker of the House of Commons from 1943 to 1951. Upon stepping down as Speaker he became the Viscount Ruffside; the peerage became extinct with his death.

Early life
Clifton Brown was born on 16 August 1879.  He was the fifth of ten children born to Amelia (née Rowe) Brown and Colonel James Clifton Brown, a Liberal Party Member of Parliament. His maternal grandparents were Charles Rowe, one of the partners in the Liverpool firm Graham, Rowe & Co., and his Lima-born wife Sarah. His elder brother was Howard Clifton Brown

His paternal grandparents were Alexander Brown and his wife Sarah Benedict Brown. His great-grandfather was the banker and merchant Sir William Brown, 1st Baronet, and his uncle was Liberal politician Sir Alexander Brown, 1st Baronet.

Clifton Brown was educated at Eton and Trinity College, Cambridge.

Career
Clifton Brown was a lieutenant in the Lancashire Artillery when on 26 March 1902 he was commissioned a second-lieutenant in the 1st Dragoon Guards, serving in South Africa during the end of the Second Boer War. He advanced to major in the regiment, and later became a lieutenant-colonel in the Volunteer force.

Political career

Clifton Brown was the Conservative Member of Parliament (MP) for Hexham from 1918 to 1923 and from 1924 to 1951. He was a Deputy Speaker of the House of Commons from 1938 to 1943 and Speaker of the House of Commons from 1943 to 1951. He was sworn of the Privy Council in 1941 and raised to the peerage as Viscount Ruffside, of Hexham in the County of Northumberland, in 1951. A private act of Parliament was passed to provide him with a pension as former Speaker.

Personal life
In 1907, Ruffside was married to Violet Cicely Kathleen Wollaston (1882–1969), daughter of Frederick Eustace Arbuthnot Wollaston.  They were the parents of one child:

 Audrey Clifton Brown (1908–2002), who married Harry Hylton-Foster, who became Speaker of the House of Commons. Audrey was created a life peeress as Baroness Hylton-Foster in honour of her husband in 1965.

Ruffside died in May 1958, aged 78.  As there were no surviving male issue from the marriage, the viscountcy became extinct. His widow, the Viscountess Ruffside, died in November 1969, aged 87.

Arms

References

External links
 
 

1879 births
1958 deaths
People educated at Eton College
Alumni of Trinity College, Cambridge
Conservative Party (UK) MPs for English constituencies
Members of the Privy Council of the United Kingdom
Speakers of the House of Commons of the United Kingdom
Deputy Lieutenants of Durham
UK MPs 1918–1922
UK MPs 1922–1923
UK MPs 1924–1929
UK MPs 1929–1931
UK MPs 1931–1935
UK MPs 1935–1945
UK MPs 1945–1950
UK MPs 1950–1951
UK MPs who were granted peerages
Ruffside, Douglas Clifton Brown, 1st Viscount
Viscounts created by George VI